The Putumayo Province is one of the eight provinces in the Loreto Region of Peru. The capital of the province is the  town of San Antonio del Estrecho.

History 
It was created by Law N° 30186, on May 5, 2014, in President Ollanta Humala's term.

Political division
The province is divided into four districts.

 Putumayo
 Rosa Panduro
 Yaguas
 Teniente Manuel Clavero

Places of interest

External links 
 PCM DNTDT

Provinces of the Loreto Region